The Caledonian Railway 60 Class were 4-6-0 passenger engines designed by William Pickersgill and introduced in 1916.  Six were built by the Caledonian Railway at its own St. Rollox works in 1916–17, and all of them passed into LMS ownership in 1923.  A further twenty locomotives of a slightly modified design were built by the LMS under the auspices of George Hughes in the period of 1925–1926.

The 60 Class were rugged and free steaming, but were unsophisticated and of lethargic performance for their size.  Although classified as passenger locomotives by the LMS, latterly they spent much of their time on goods trains and acquired the nickname Greybacks, either in reference to their long and grimy boilers or possibly as an insult from former Glasgow and South Western Railway enginemen ('greyback' being an old term for louse).  Withdrawals began in 1944 but twenty three passed into British Railways ownership in 1948. The last locomotives were withdrawn from service in 1953, and all were scrapped.

Numbering and Locomotive Histories

sources Longworth (2005) and RailUK

Technical details

Pickersgill Caledonian Railway design
See box, top right.

Hughes LMS development of Pickersgill design
The locomotives built by the LMS had slightly larger cylinders and weighed slightly less than the original CR locomotives. Details were as for the CR locomotives except:

Introduced: 1925
Boiler Pressure: 
Two cylinders: 
Loco Weight: 
Tender Weight: 
Starting tractive effort:

References

060
4-6-0 locomotives
Railway locomotives introduced in 1916
Scrapped locomotives